is a Japanese professional footballer who plays as a forward for Taiwan Football Premier League club Taichung Futuro. He holds the record for the youngest Japanese player to make his professional debut and the youngest scorer in J1 League history. Morimoto represented Japan at the 2004 and 2008 versions of the Toulon Tournament, the 2004 AFC Youth Championship, the 2005 FIFA World Youth Championship, the 2008 Summer Olympics and the 2010 FIFA World Cup.

Club career

Youth career
Born in Kawasaki, Kanagawa, Morimoto began his youth career with Tsudayama FC in 1995, before transferring to Verdy Junior in 1998. After three-year, Morimoto moved to Verdy Junior Youth in 2001, and remained until 2004, when he was sold to Tokyo Verdy.

Tokyo Verdy
On 13 March 2004, Morimoto made his J1 League debut for Tokyo Verdy against Júbilo Iwata at the age of 15 years, 10 months and 6 days, a league record for youngest player to debut. He scored his first goal against JEF United Ichihara on 5 May of the same year, two days before his 16th birthday, another league record for youngest goal scorer. He captured the J.League Rookie of the Year Award for the 2004 season. During the 2004 season, Morimoto was teammates with former Cerro Porteño player Nozomi Hiroyama. In the 2005 season at Tokyo Verdy, Morimoto was teammates with Riki Kitawaki, who would play in Paraguay before Morimoto would do the same several years later. On 23 July 2006, Tokyo Verdy announced a one-year loan deal sending Morimoto to Catania of Serie A.

Catania
Morimoto made his Serie A debut on 28 January 2007 during an away game against Atalanta. He entered the game at the 83rd minute and scored the equalising goal, his first, just five minutes later. On 13 March 2007, it was confirmed by Catania that Morimoto had ruptured the anterior cruciate ligament (ACL) in his left knee and would be out for at least six months, ruling him out for the remainder of the 2006–07 season. Despite the serious injury, Catania recognised his true potential and he completed a permanent transfer deal with Catania in June 2007.

On 14 December 2008, Morimoto signed a three-year contract extension with Catania lasting to 2011.

Morimoto had a breakthrough season for Catania during the 2008–09 season, as he scored 10 goals in 25 league and Coppa Italia games, while also being credited with several assists. Brazilian and Milan star Alexandre Pato told Italian sports daily Corriere dello Sport that he believed Morimoto was the best young player in Serie A and compared him to Ronaldo.

Despite all the talent and all the potential, the striker has never really lived up to all the expectations following an improvement in each of his first three seasons in Sicily. During the 2009–10 season, Morimoto scored an additional five goals, adding a further two during the 2010–11 league campaign. His performances have often been over-shadowed by the likes of Giuseppe Mascara, Maxi López, Jorge Martínez and Gionatha Spinesi, while the signing of Argentine international Gonzalo Bergessio also limited his chances to feature.

On 11 July 2011, Catania confirmed to have sold Morimoto to newly promoted Serie A club Novara in a co-ownership bid. Morimoto's season was hampered by injuries which limited the Japanese international to just 18 league appearances, producing four goals. At the end of the season, Novara was relegated to Serie B after placing 19th, and Morimoto officially returned to Catania on 21 June 2012.

On 7 January 2013, Morimoto was loaned to Al-Nasr Dubai, coached by former Catania manager Walter Zenga. The loan deal expired on 30 June 2013 and the player returned to Sicily.

JEF United Chiba
Morimoto signed for J2 League club JEF United Chiba on 14 August 2013, for an undisclosed fee.

Kawasaki Frontale
On 24 December 2015, Morimoto signed for Kawasaki Frontale on a two-year deal, with the contract starting 1 February 2016.

AEP Kozani
In October 2020, Morimoto signed for Greek Football League club AEP Kozani, for an undisclosed fee. Having not being able to play because of the league being indefinitely suspended because of the COVID-19 pandemic he asked for his release, making him a free agent.

Sportivo Luqueño
In January 2021, Primera División Paraguaya team Sportivo Luqueño confirmed through their president that Morimito was going to arrive to Paraguay to sign for the club. In February 2021, Morimoto signed with the club. He was presented by the club through Twitter. He joined former Paraguay national team players Edgar Benitez, Guillermo Beltran and Luis Cabral. On 17 April 2021, Morimoto debuted for Sportivo Luqueño against Nacional Asunción in a 1–0 away defeat, being substituted onto the field in the 81st for Guillermo Beltran. This was his only appearance for the club, as he was released soon after.

International career
Morimoto represented Japan at the Japan U20 national team level at both the 2004 AFC Youth Championship and the 2005 World Youth Championship. In 2008, he was a member of the Japan U23 national team for the 2008 Summer Olympics, where the team was eliminated in the preliminary round, losing all three matches and only managing to score one goal.

On 10 October 2009, Morimoto made his debut for the senior national team against Scotland, coming on as a substitute for Ryoichi Maeda in a 2–0 win. On 14 October 2009, he made his first start and scored his first goal against Togo in a 5–0 win.

Personal life
In March 2021, Morimoto was involved in a traffic collision in Paraguay after crashing his vehicle against a motorcycle.

Career statistics

Club

International

Scores and results list Japan's goal tally first, score column indicates score after each Morimoto goal.

Honours
Tokyo Verdy
Emperor's Cup: 2004
Japanese Super Cup: 2005

Kawasaki Frontale
J1 League: 2017

Individual
J.League Rookie of the Year: 2004
Manchester United Premier Cup Most Valuable Player: 2003

References

External links

 Takayuki Morimoto at Playmakerstats
 
 
 Japan National Football Team Database
 

1988 births
Living people
Association football people from Tokyo
Japanese footballers
Association football forwards
Japan international footballers
Japan youth international footballers
J1 League players
J2 League players
Serie A players
UAE Pro League players
Tokyo Verdy players
Catania S.S.D. players
Novara F.C. players
Al-Nasr SC (Dubai) players
JEF United Chiba players
Kawasaki Frontale players
Avispa Fukuoka players
AEP Kozani F.C. players
Olympic footballers of Japan
Footballers at the 2008 Summer Olympics
2010 FIFA World Cup players
Japanese expatriate footballers
Japanese expatriate sportspeople in Italy
Expatriate footballers in Italy
Japanese expatriate sportspeople in the United Arab Emirates
Expatriate footballers in the United Arab Emirates
Japanese expatriate sportspeople in Paraguay
Expatriate footballers in Paraguay